Philip Scott Kosnett is an American diplomat.  He was sworn in as the fifth U.S. Ambassador to the Republic of Kosovo on November 27, 2018.  Kosnett's previous assignment was as Chargé d'Affaires ad interim at the United States Embassy in Ankara, Turkey.
Kosnett was nominated in July 2018 by U.S. president Trump to be the next ambassador to the Republic of Kosovo.  The Senate confirmed him in this position in September 2018.

Early life and education 
Kosnett grew up in New Jersey and Illinois and graduated with an Artium Baccalaureus (Bachelor of Arts) in Government from Harvard University in 1982.

Career 
Kosnett worked as a game designer during his enrollment in high school and college, primarily for the company Simulations Publications, Inc. in New York.  After graduating from Harvard University he worked as a teacher in Japan. He then launched a career in the Foreign Service, with his first assignment in Ankara, Turkey, serving as a political and consular officer. Following his initial assignment, he then served at eight different United States Missions in Europe, Asia, and the Middle East and in senior leadership positions at the Department of State.
The positions included Deputy Chief of Mission and Chargé d'Affaires of the U.S. Embassy in Reykjavik, Iceland and Deputy Chief of Mission at the Embassy in Tashkent, Uzbekistan.
He also served in other political, political-military, and economic-commercial positions at the US Embassies in Afghanistan, Iraq, Kosovo, Netherlands, and Japan.

In Washington, Kosnett served in the State Department's bureaus of European, Counter-terrorism, Political-Military, and Intelligence & Research affairs and also worked in the 24-hour Operations Center.

Before beginning his assignment in Turkey, Kosnett served as Director of the State Department Office of Southern European Affairs and was responsible for U.S. relations with Turkey, Greece, and Cyprus.

Diplomatic Service in Turkey 
In July 2016, Kosnett began working at the U.S. Embassy in Ankara, Turkey, initially as the Deputy Chief of Mission. He then assumed the duties of Chargé d’Affaires on October 15, 2017, after former ambassador John R. Bass finished his assignment.

United States Ambassador to Kosovo 
In July 2018, Kosnett was nominated by the U.S. president to be the next ambassador to Kosovo. Kosnett succeeded Greg Delawie, who was U.S. Ambassador to Kosovo 2015–2018.  Kosnett's nomination was confirmed in September 2018 by the Senate.

Post-Government Career
Since retiring from federal service in 2021, Kosnett has taken on roles in consulting, policy analysis, education, and humanitarian action.

Award 
Kosnett is the recipient of over 10 Department of State awards, including the State Department Superior Honor and Meritorious Honor Awards. He was also awarded the Medal for Exceptional Civilian Service by the Office of the Secretary of Defense, and the Army  Army Medal for Outstanding Civilian Service.  He was awarded the Kosovo Order of Dr. Ibrahim Rugova by President Vjosa Osmani.

Personal life 
Kosnett is married to Alison Kosnett, an international business and development consultant. They have 2 children: Alex, an environmental planner, and Nicole, a social media producer. Kosnett speaks Turkish, Russian, Dutch, and Japanese.

References 

Ambassadors of the United States to Kosovo
Harvard University alumni
American game designers
United States Foreign Service personnel
Living people
21st-century American diplomats
Year of birth missing (living people)